The Red Ghost (Ivan Kragoff) and his Super-Apes (Mikhlo/Михло, Igor/Игорь, and Peotr/Пётр) are a group of supervillains appearing in American comic books published by Marvel Comics. The characters started their career fighting the Fantastic Four, before confronting other Marvel heroes, such as Iron Man and Spider-Man.

Publication history

The Red Ghost and his Super-Apes were created by Stan Lee and Jack Kirby and first appeared in Fantastic Four #13 (April 1963).

Fictional character biography
Ivan Kragoff was born in Leningrad, in what was at the time the Soviet Union. Before becoming the Red Ghost, Ivan was a Soviet scientist bent on beating the Americans to the Moon and claiming it for the Communist empire. He assembled a crew of three trained primates — Mikhlo the gorilla, Igor the baboon, and Peotr the orangutan — which he subjected to specialized training regimens of his own design. He then took off on his lunar rocket trip on behalf of the USSR, while on the very next panel, the Fantastic Four were aiming their own rocket for the same destination.

Kragoff knew enough of the Fantastic Four's history, and he purposefully designed his rocket in such a way that he and his crew would be heavily exposed to the cosmic rays that he expected would infuse them with superpowers. This attempt was successful: Kragoff gained the ability to become as intangible and invisible as a "ghost", Mikhlo became superhumanly strong and durable, Igor gained the ability to shapeshift and could transform into nearly anything, and Peotr gained the ability to attract and repulse objects. 

The Red Ghost and his Super-Apes, as he called them, battled the Fantastic Four soon after gaining their powers, first meeting the Thing. Red Ghost encountered Uatu the Watcher during this fight, who said he would bring the two warring groups together in a fight for supremacy over the Moon. The Red Ghost and his apes first defeated the Four and kidnapped the Invisible Girl. But he was defeated by the Fantastic Four and left on the Moon when the apes rebelled against him after the Invisible Girl deactivated a force field, allowing them access to the food the Red Ghost kept from them. Mikhlo then broke down the metal door, freeing the Invisible Girl. The Red Ghost got into the Watcher's base hoping to use his secrets, but was unable to understand the technology, and was thrown from the area by the Watcher. The Fantastic Four then used a paralyzing ray to stop him.

With his Super-Apes, he later again battled the Fantastic Four on the Moon, and again encountered the Watcher. Kragoff was accidentally teleported to Earth by the Watcher's matter transporter. The Red Ghost was expelled from the Communist Party and his Super-Apes were impounded. He formed an alliance with the Mole Man who was trying to use an earthquake machine to attack the surface world, and battled the Avengers, but was defeated. Back with the Super-Apes again, Kragoff appeared among the villains assembled by Doctor Doom to destroy the Fantastic Four. Kragoff eventually lost his original powers. He formed an alliance with the Unicorn to steal Anthony Stark's cosmic-ray intensifier, which he used to gain the new superhuman power of a mist-like form and to give powers to his new trained apes, Alpha and Beta. He battled Iron Man and the Unicorn, but was defeated by Alpha and Beta, who turned against him. He later formed an alliance with Attuma and battled the Defenders, but was defeated.

Kragoff next experimented with a cosmic-ray intensifier to attempt to increase his own superhuman powers, but instead unintentionally caused himself to be unable to leave a state of intangibility. He had his original Super-Apes kidnap Anthony Stark and forced him to build a "cosmitronic cannon" and return him to a tangible state. He battled Iron Man, but the next time Kragoff became intangible, his atoms began to disperse as a side effect of his treatment with the cannon. Kragoff's consciousness managed to force his atoms to remain together, although his body remained in an intangible and, at times, invisible state.

Months later, Mister Fantastic went into space to expose himself to cosmic radiation to revitalize his own powers. Unknown to Richards, Kragoff, still intangible, was also aboard the spaceship. Kragoff used his invisibility to hide from Richards for days until he was able to immerse himself again in cosmic radiation, restoring his powers to what they originally had been. The Red Ghost could again become tangible or intangible and visible and invisible at will. He even gained the power to make other objects in his vicinity intangible and invisible. Fully recovered, he battled Mister Fantastic and escaped.

With the Super-Apes, the Red Ghost attempted to steal a rare mathematical treatise from Empire State University. He battled Spider-Man, but escaped. He attempted to cause earthquakes in Soviet cities, and battled the Soviet Super-Soldiers. He forced the Black Fox to accompany the Super-Apes on robberies. He once again battled Spider-Man, but escaped.

Alongside Klaw, the Living Laser, and Venom during the Acts of Vengeance, he attempted to steal alien technology from the Watcher's home on the Moon. The Red Ghost used the powers he had gained from his re-exposure to attack Quasar. He was captured in this attempt. With the Super-Apes, the Red Ghost attempted to steal the alien technology of the smartship Friday; he battled Mister Fantastic, the Invisible Woman, and Power Pack, and was captured.

The Super-Apes later show up alone, having separated themselves from the Red Ghost and started a life of crime on their own by taking over a private zoo in Salina, Kansas. They had turned the animals against the local population and captured three members of the New Warriors when they entered the complex. Instead of fighting their way out of the situation, they used their intellect and settled on a peaceful coexistence with the people of the town.

Shortly after the Fantastic Four returned from a pocket dimension created by Franklin Richards, the Super-Apes had gained high levels of intelligence and were working on a virus that would take out humans, leaving simians dominant. The Red Ghost, conversely, had degenerated into a childlike mental state and spent most of the time interested in a rabbit.

The Red Ghost and his Super-Apes teamed up again and the Red Ghost regained his original intelligence. They attempted to build a new Communist state in the political vacuum of Niganda — the Socialist Simian Republic of Niganda, "A country where a new form of Marxist-Leninist socialism can grow, based on the purity of the ape world."

The Red Ghost later appeared as a member of the Intelligencia among other super-geniuses. While the Red Hulk was fighting the X-Men, the Red Ghost managed to capture the Beast and the Black Panther and sent his Super-Apes to assist the Red Hulk only for them to attack the Red Hulk. Mikhlo was killed by the Red Hulk, which enraged the Red Ghost.

The Red Ghost replaced Mikhlo with Grigori, a baby gorilla that was possibly stolen from the Leningrad Zoo. The Red Ghost gave Grigori super-strength via scraps left behind by Department X. The Red Ghost's new team was short-lived as, not long after creating Grigori, the She-Hulks attacked and captured the foursome.

The Red Ghost was with the Intelligencia when they were attacked by the Sinister Six. During the battle, he and his apes were killed when Doctor Octopus used the Zero Cannon to launch them into space.

MODOK Superior was able to revive the Red Ghost and his Super-Apes and the other Intelligencia members where they began to formulate their plans after their predicted shatter of the superhero community.

During the Civil War II storyline, the Red Ghost and his Super-Apes appeared working on a new science project when Steve Rogers, the original Captain America, entered the laboratory. The Red Ghost sent the Super-Apes to attack Steve, who kills them one by one. The Red Ghost tries to escape, losing his right arm and left leg in the process, and is killed by Steve, who confiscated his project so he could use it for his own agenda.

Miklo, Igor, and Peotr somehow turn up alive as the Super-Apes have taken over the Central Park Zoo as they are now joined by a powered-up chimpanzee named Yaroslavi. The Thunderbolts have a hard time subduing them until the police use knock-out gas in the area. The Super-Apes were arrested afterwards.

Powers and abilities
Ivan Kragoff possesses the ability to become intangible at will, as well as affecting nearby people and objects. Through his psionic field, the Red Ghost could achieve different degrees of incorporability, such as floating while untouchable or walking on air (in a manner similar to Shadowcat). He can turn transparent when in non-corporeal form, from the extent that sensitive equipment of Reed Richards was unable to detect him from hiding over several days. The Red Ghost is able to solidify each parts of his body at a time, while the rest remains insubstantial. Since his additional bombardment to cosmic rays, Kragoff can also become invisible and even turn into red mist. Unfortunately, these powers were intermittent. He lost them after being irradiated by a heavy dose of more radiation in space. When in "ghost mode", his body's metabolism enables him to go without sustenance for extended periods of time.

Achievements
The Red Ghost is a scientific genius with advanced knowledge of rocketry, engineering, and physics. He is also skilled in training simians. Kragoff has perfected force field generators, devices that mentally communicate with or control other primates, ice guns, high energy fuel from materials found inside the meteor fragment, and a spacecraft made of transparent ceramic plastic to be unshielded against cosmic ray storms. He have studied various forms of Socialist and Communist theory.

Known Super-Apes
 Miklo - A gorilla who gained super-strength and durability. While he was killed by Red Hulk, he later turned up alive.
 Igor - A baboon who gained shapeshifting abilities.
 Peotr - An orangutan who gained the ability to attract and repel objects.
 Alpha - A gorilla with super-strength who betrayed Red Ghost.
 Beta - A gorilla with mind-control abilities who betrayed Red Ghost
 Grigori - A baby gorilla that Red Ghost took in as a successor of Miklo and possessed the same abilities as Miklo.
 Yaroslavi - A chimpanzee with energy-projecting abilities.

Other versions

Ultimate Marvel
The Ultimate Marvel version of Ivan Kragoff was introduced in Ultimate Fantastic Four #47 (December 2007). He is based in a laboratory in Siberia, and is first seen experimenting on a bear named Misha, with the ability to talk. He is in contact with Dr. Franklin Storm, and persuades Storm that Sue and Reed might be interested in his work. His assistant Sorba Rutskaya then destroys their plane with a beam weapon and captures them. It appears Kragoff's work is focused towards reviving a woman named Irina, whom Storm believes is dead. Sorba later stabs Kragoff, and reveals that she plans on using a beam of energy from the N-Zone to merge herself with Sue so that she can gain her powers and use them to destroy those that she believes are harming nature. As the beam is about to combine the two, Sue escapes and the beam hits Sorba and several vials of simian DNA. When the smoke clears, it is revealed that Sorba has become a gigantic, deformed, gorilla-like creature with multiple simian limbs and heads, as well as a single human head which retains her insane personality. In addition to possessing the intangibility powers of the original Red Ghost, Sorba can also create apes and monkeys from her body that are subservient to her will where each of them is capable of manifesting N-Zone superpowers. She begins to attack Sue as Reed, Johnny, Ben, and the Crimson Dynamo rush to save Sue. Sue is able to "overload" her by inserting many other samples of animal DNA.

Marvel Apes/Zombies
Stuck between dimensions with the simian version of Speedball, the Red Ghost finds himself allied with the simians in the Marvel Apes world fighting against the Marvel Zombies.

In other media

Television
 The Red Ghost and his Super-Apes appear in Fantastic Four, voiced by Vic Perrin.
 The Red Ghost and his Super-Apes appear in The Avengers: Earth's Mightiest Heroes. In the episode "Breakout, Part 1", they are shown as inmates of the Big House when a mass breakout occurs, allowing them to escape. In the episode "Ultron-5", the Red Ghost and his Super-Apes are defeated off-screen by the Hulk and Black Panther.
 The Red Ghost and his Super-Apes appears in the Hulk and the Agents of S.M.A.S.H. episode "The Defiant Hulks", voiced by JB Blanc. After Red Hulk and Skaar capture Abomination while Hulk was covering for Vista Verde's vacationing Mayor Stan, Red Ghost and his Super-Apes intercept their transport to drain the Abomination's gamma energy to make an army of Abomin-Apes. Once Hulk, She-Hulk, and A-Bomb arrive at the Red Ghost's castle, the Agents of S.M.A.S.H. defeat the Red Ghost and his Super-Apes, who regress back to normal. They and the Abomination are later transferred to S.H.I.E.L.D.'s custody.

Video games
The Red Ghost and his Super-Apes appears in the Xbox 360 and PS3 versions of the Fantastic Four: Rise of the Silver Surfer film tie-in game, voiced by Dwight Schultz. While fighting the Fantastic Four on a space station, the Red Ghost reveals Galactus is coming and that they must stay on the station if they hope to survive. When the station starts to self-destruct, the Fantastic Four urge the Red Ghost to come with them, but he refuses and disappears while they escape.

References

External links
 Red Ghost at Marvel.com

Characters created by Jack Kirby
Characters created by Stan Lee
Comics characters introduced in 1963
Fictional aerospace engineers
Fictional astronauts
Fictional characters who can turn intangible
Fictional characters who can turn invisible
Fictional Soviet people
Marvel Comics male supervillains
Marvel Comics mutates
Marvel Comics scientists